Lej da la Tscheppa is a lake above Sils Maria, in the Engadine valley of the Grisons, Switzerland. It used to be fed by water from the Crasta-Tscheppa Glacier (melted in 2003).

See also
List of mountain lakes of Switzerland

References

Lakes of Graubünden
Tscheppa
Sils im Engadin/Segl
Engadin